Apomempsis is a genus of longhorn beetles of the subfamily Lamiinae, containing the following species:

 Apomempsis bufo (Chevrolat, 1855)
 Apomempsis densepunctata Breuning, 1939
 Apomempsis similis Breuning, 1939

References

Morimopsini
Cerambycidae genera